The Ukrainian Cooperative Movement was a movement that addressed the economic plight of the Ukrainian people through the creation of financial, agricultural and trade cooperatives that enabled Ukrainians (primarily peasants) to pool their resources, to obtain less expensive loans and insurance, and to pay less for products such as farm equipment. The cooperatives played a major role in the social and economic mobilization of the Ukrainian people, most of whom were peasants.  First begun in 1883, by 1939 cooperatives had 700,000 members in western Ukraine, employing 15,000 Ukrainians.  The cooperatives were shut down by the Soviet authorities when western Ukraine was annexed by the Soviet Union in 1939.  However, they continue to exist and flourish among Ukrainian emigrants and their descendants in North and South America, Europe and Australia—in Ukrainian diaspora.

History

Under Austrian Rule

The Ukrainian cooperative movement originated in Galicia, a western Ukrainian region that was part of Austria-Hungary.  Initially, the Ukrainian Prosvita society which had been dedicated to educational and cultural efforts attempted to organize credit unions, stores and warehouses.  Its ability to do so was limited, however, by lack of experience in economic matters. The need for an experienced organizer was fulfilled by Vasyl Nahirny (Ukrainian Galician architect and public figure, one of the "parents" of the cooperative movement in Galicia), who had spent a decade in Switzerland studying that nation's well-developed cooperative systems.  In 1883 he organized Narodna Torhivlia ("People's Trade"), whose goal was to buy and sell products in large quantities, eliminate middlemen, and pass the savings on to the Ukrainian villagers.  Through this cooperative Nahirny hoped to familiarize Ukrainians with commerce.

Many other cooperatives followed. In 1899, Silsky Hospodar, whose aim was to teach the peasants modern farming methods, was founded.  By 1913 it had 32,000 members. Dnister, an insurance company, was established in Lviv and by 1907 had 213,000 policyholders.  Most important, however, was the rise of Ukrainian Credit unions.  Although some existed as early as 1874, the Vira credit union was the first to be stable and well-regulated.  Typically charging approximately 10% interest for loans, hundreds of credit unions sprung up throughout Austrian-ruled Ukraine. They helped put traditional moneylenders out of business. In 1904, a central association of Ukrainian cooperatives was formed, which had 550 institutional affiliates and 180,000 individual members.

The Ukrainian Greek Catholic Church and its clergy were heavily involved in the cooperative movement, and an association of priests formed whose focus was on improving the peasants' socioeconomic conditions.  Many priests took part in organizing cooperatives.  The Church's leader, Andrei Sheptytsky, taught that the poor needed more than merely money and that the educated or well off had a duty to help the poor learn how to raise themselves from their circumstances - "teach them, show them how to improve their lot."

The rise of the cooperative movement in late 19th century Ukraine had several effects.  It helped to bring about a close and harmonious relationship between the intelligentsia of western Ukraine and the peasantry, something that the intelligentsia in Russian-ruled Ukraine was not able to accomplish. Because the cooperative movement was largely the project of Ukrainophiles (those western Ukrainians with a patriotic Ukrainian national orientation), its practical help to the Ukrainian population contributed to its allegiance to the Ukrainian national movement rather than to the competing pro-Russian orientation. Indeed, improvement in economic standards developed concurrently with the increase in Ukrainian national consciousness.<ref name ="magocsi">Paul Robert Magocsi. (1996).  A History of Ukraine. Toronto: University of Toronto Press, pg. 442 and pg. 589</ref> Because the professions of moneylending and shopkeeping had traditionally been Jewish vocations in western Ukraine, the cooperative movement also created financial hardship for the local Jewish community, by eliminating many Jewish jobs. The financial hardship caused antagonism between the two communities and was a cause for Jewish emigration from Galicia.

Under Polish Rule

After Austria-Hungary collapsed following the first world war, in 1918 western Ukrainians declared an independent state that was conquered and absorbed by Poland in 1919.  This dramatically widened the scope of the Ukrainian cooperative movement.  No longer merely a tool for economic progress, cooperatives came to be seen as a school for self-government and a method of economic self-defence against the Polish occupiers.  The movement was particularly supported by western Ukrainians' largest and most significant political party, the Ukrainian National Democratic Alliance. Many western Ukrainian veterans took part in the movement, claiming that "by working in the cooperatives we are once again the nation's soldiers." Every bit of capital that stayed in Ukrainian hands was seen as a victory against the Polish enemy. The cooperative organization grew and became elaborately organized.  Credit Unions were united into the Tsentrobank ("Central Bank"). Narodnia Torhivlia (People's Trade") brought together urban retailers. Dairy cooperatives united to form Maslosoyuz'', which included dairies supplied by over 200,000 farms.  It dominated the western Ukrainian and even much of the central Polish market, and exported to Austria and Czechoslovakia.  Women had their own cooperative, which by 1936 included 36,000 members.  It taught women how to operate cooperatives and nursing schools, and established a cooperative that helped to popularize and sell folk art made at home.

All of these organizations were further subordinated into an umbrella organization called the Audit Union of Ukrainian Cooperatives (RUSK).  The number of Ukrainian cooperatives in Galicia grew from 580 in 1921 to 2,500 in 1928 and approximately 4,000 by 1939.  Membership on the eve of the second world war was estimated at 700,000 people, and the cooperatives employed over 15,000 Ukrainians.

The Polish government was alarmed by the growth of Ukrainian cooperatives and attempted to limit them by supporting Polish cooperatives and creating problems through allegations of hygiene code violations or incorrect filing of reports.  In 1934, the Polish government passed a law forcing Ukrainian cooperatives outside Galicia to unite with Polish ones. Despite such tactics, Ukrainians had twice as many cooperatives per capita than did Poles.

When the Soviet Union annexed western Ukraine in 1939, the Soviet authorities liquidated most Ukrainian community institutions, including Ukrainian cooperatives.

Outside Ukraine

Western Ukrainians brought cooperatives with them as they emigrated to North and South America, western Europe and Australia.  Credit unions served the purpose of offering personal and business loans that Ukrainian immigrants would have otherwise have had difficulty obtaining from other financial institutions.  The success of the Ukrainian credit unions is reflected in the fact that by the late 1990s, Ukrainian credit unions in the United States alone had assets of 1.1 billion dollars. Ten years later, this had grown to 2.146 billion dollars in assets held by 17 Ukrainian American Credit Unions. In 2006, 10 Ukrainian credit unions in Canada reported assets of 1.2 billion dollars CDN. These credit unions continue the Ukrainian cooperative movement's mission of service to the Ukrainian community. In 2007, Ukrainian American credit unions donated over 3 million dollars in support of Ukrainian community organizations.

See also

 Agricultural cooperative
 Cooperative
 Ukrainian National Democratic Alliance
 Khrystofor Baranovsky

References

Cooperative movement
Mutualism (movement)
Economic history of Ukraine
20th century in Ukraine
Social history of Ukraine
Cooperatives in Ukraine
Agrarian politics
Soviet occupation of Eastern Poland 1939–1941
Ukrainian nationalism
Socialism in Ukraine
Catholic social teaching
Ukrainians in Poland
Ukrainian Austro-Hungarians